The 11th Grey Cup was played on December 1, 1923, before 8,629 fans at Varsity Stadium in Toronto.

Queen's University shut out the Regina Rugby Club 54–0, the biggest Grey Cup victory margin ever achieved.

External links
 
 

Grey Cup
Grey Cup, 11th
Grey Cup
1923 in Ontario
December 1923 sports events
1920s in Toronto
Saskatchewan Roughriders